Clementia of Burgundy (c. 1078 – c. 1133) was countess of Flanders by marriage to Robert II of Flanders. She acted as regent of Flanders from 1096 until 1100, while her spouse was on crusade, and in the name of their son Baldwin VII from 1111 until 1119.

Background
Clementia was the daughter of Count William I of Burgundy and a noblewoman named Stephanie. Her family was heavily attached to the Catholic Church, with two of her brothers becoming archbishops and another brother becoming Pope Callixtus II.

Countess of Flanders

In 1092, Clementia married Robert II, Count of Flanders and became Countess of Flanders. Her husband gave her an impressive dower, which included, "one-third of Flanders, including twelve towns located in the maritime and southwestern regions of Flanders, and stretching from Lille to Douai to Bapaume." Because her dower contained so much land and so many towns, it created the opportunity for Clementia to build relationships with the people, which further allowed her to become the "patron of various monasteries, [to] develop bonds of friendship with important families, and help spread comital influence throughout the area. By doing so, [she] developed the power to participate in the rule of Flanders."

Clementia and her husband Count Robert II had three sons together, and it was their son Baldwin that would come into rule after the death of Robert II in 1111.

First regency
When her husband, Count Robert II, left to go on the First Crusade in 1096, Clementia became regent of Flanders. As the ruling force she influenced the production of money, such as imprinting her own name on minted coins. She was also asked to help deal with violent matters like protecting pilgrims from assault in Bapaume.

When Robert II returned from crusading though, her power and influence did not end. They ruled together, with her name appearing on many of the charters instigated by her husband. Much of her influence after her husband's return becomes focused on her involvement with the church and specifically her patronage of multiple monasteries, abbes, and the donating of land for church use.

Second regency
In 1111 Count Robert II died in a battle at Meaux. After his death their son Baldwin VII came into power. Despite being eighteen years old and thus old enough to rule alone, Clementia was formally recognized as his co-regent throughout his reign. Clementia was extremely powerful, in particular, during his first year of reign, with all the charters of the time containing her name. They ruled together with relative peace, until Baldwin VII began to form a stronger bond with his cousin Charles of Denmark.

In 1119, Baldwin VII was killed in battle and Charles succeeded him as count. Clementia did not like Charles and used her influence to raise an army against him. She lost the battle to Charles when he captured four of her dower towns, which led to the cutting off of resources for her army. This caused Clementia to lose her power to rule Flanders.

Regardless, "Clematia continued to issue charters concerning her dower lands and towns until her death in 1133."

Second marriage
After her son, Baldwin VII, died in 1119, she married Count Godfrey I of Louvain. Clementia may have been the mother of Godfrey's son Joscelin, although some historians consider the possibility that he was born of a mistress.

Notes

Sources
Adair, Penelope Ann. "Ego et Uxor Mea... :""Countess Clemente and her Role in the Comital Family and Flanders (1092-1133)." (PhD Diss, University of California at Santa Barbara, 1993).
Bouchard, Constance B. "Consanguinity and Noble Marriages in the Tenth and Eleventh Centuries." Speculum. Medieval Academy of America. Vol. 56 No. 2. (April 1981) pp. 268–287.
Bouchard, Constance B. Sword, Miter, and Cloister: Nobility and the Church in Burgundy 980-1198. Ithaca: Cornell University Press, 1987.
Everglades, Theodore. Aristocratic Women in Medieval France. Philadelphia: University of Pennsylvania Press, 1999.
Rider, Jeff and Alva V. Murray. Gilbert of Bruges and the Historiography of Medieval Flanders. Washington D.C.: The Catholic University of America Press, 2009.

External links
 Women's Biography: Clementia of Burgundy, countess of Flanders, contains letters sent and received by Clementia.

|-

Anscarids
12th-century women rulers
11th-century women rulers
Women in 12th-century warfare
12th-century women from the county of Flanders
11th-century French women
Women in war in France
Women in war in the Netherlands
Countesses of Flanders
Women in medieval European warfare